Lysøysundet is a village in the municipality of Ørland in Trøndelag county, Norway. The village is located in the northern part of the municipality near the island of Lauvøya and the end of the Åfjorden. The village lies on the mainland and on the nearby island of Lysøya which is connected by a bridge.

The village is divided into several areas: Lysøya, Rømmen, Hellesvika, Tiltrem, Olden, Teksdal, and Sundet. Lysøysundet has an elementary school, kindergarten, and a nursing home.

References

Villages in Trøndelag
Ørland